Ontinyent Club de Fútbol was a Spanish football team based in Ontinyent, in the autonomous community of Valencia. Founded in 1947 it held home games at Estadio El Clariano, with a capacity of 5,000 seats.

On 28 March 2019, due to economic problems, the club resigned from the Segunda División B and announced it would cease its activity.

Season to season

5 seasons in Segunda División
17 seasons in Segunda División B
43 seasons in Tercera División

Notable former players

Note: this list includes players that have played at least 100 league games and/or have reached international status.
 Keita Karamokoba
 Omar Arellano
 Alberto Quintero
 José Aveiro
 Gonzalo Bonastre
 Álex Cacho
 Álvaro Cervera
 Marañón
 Àlex Pascual
 David Porras
 David Rangel
 Julián Rubio
 César Soriano

References

External links
Official website 
Futbolme team profile 
Unofficial website 
Estadios de España 

 
Football clubs in the Valencian Community
Association football clubs established in 1947
Association football clubs disestablished in 2019
1947 establishments in Spain
2019 disestablishments in the Valencian Community
Segunda División clubs